Unit 888 “Refaim” is an elite special forces unit in the Israeli Defense Force. The unit was established in 2019 by Israeli Chief of Staff Aviv Kokhavi, for battle on the battlefield of the future. The unit operates in all battle arenas to detect, attack and destroy the enemy in all theaters of operation and in all domains, combining the capabilities of infantry, engineering, anti-tank warfare, air and Intelligence all into one Special Operations Force. The unit is also tasked with proving new operational technology on the battlefield that could serve as potential technology for other units in the future. 

Units 888s operators go through physical, mental and overall characteristics selection before starting training. Due to the tasks of the unit and the intense mix with both battle and technology the soldiers are tested with creativity and problem solving tests on top of regular special forces selection processes. Training consists of learning the art of combat while enduring an extremely physical and mental challenge of 14–16 months which not all participants make it through. The operators that successfully complete training could be sent to additional qualifications (Medical, Snipers etc… and other undisclosed courses). Then they continue their service participating in classified operations of multiple types, training and preparing for the next mission or war.

In February 2020, the order of foundation of the unit was approved, and a symbol was discovered – a Sword, built into the number eight, with arrows nested  in different directions.

Gallery

References

External links 

 Such a unit was never in the IDF – until today, on IDF website, January 2020

Special forces of Israel